The Museum Godshuis Belle is a small museum in Ypres. Located in the chapel of an old almshouse, it houses the art collection of the Ypres Public Centre for Social Welfare (OCMW in Dutch).

History
During the broadcloth crisis in 1270-1274, many people in Ypres became poor and needed support. A caritative institution was created c. 1273 by Christine de Guinness, the widow of Salomon Belle. By 1276, it was expanded with a chapel and a hospital. Jehan Yperman, the first medical writer in Dutch, worked here from 1304 until his death in 1331. In 1616, a new chapel was built.

Until 1796, the Godshuis was led by descendants of Salomon Belle. Then it became a civic institution, used especially for the care of the elderly. It is still in use today and forms the main seat of the Ypres OCMW. The chapel functions as the Museum Godshuis Belle.

Like most of Ypres, the site was destroyed during the First World War, and rebuilt afterwards. The architects were Georges Lernould and Jules Coomans, who drew some of the plans but died before the actual building started. They partly reconstructed the old buildings, and partly made new Gothic Revival buildings. The chapel was rebuilt in 1933-1934, with a reconstructed interior.

The building became a protected heritage site in 1940.

Collection
The most important painting in the collection is the painting of the Virgin with the donors Joos Bryde and Yolenthe Belle and their children. It was painted in 1420 by an unknown artist (sometimes called the Master of 1420) and is one of the oldest examples of panel painting in Flanders. The rest of the collection includes more paintings by old masters, a 17th-century altar draping, and a 17th-century linen-press.

Notes

Museum Godshuis Belle

Buildings and structures in Ypres
Museums in West Flanders
Art museums and galleries in Belgium